adMarketplace is a search advertising marketplace. The privately held company is headquartered in New York City.

adMarketplace introduced an algorithmic bidding solution, BidSmart, for their search advertising platform in early 2014.

Search advertising marketplaces represent a sizable but often overlooked segment of the Search Engine Marketing industry.

Services
adMarketplace operates an online marketplace that connects advertisers and publishers to serve PPC search ads on publisher properties in response to a user's search.  The company places keyword-targeted ads on web properties outside of traditional search engine result pages.

adMarketplace offers advertisers scale and performance via access to exclusive search traffic, according to the company website.

For publishers, the company offers custom search monetization, flexible implementation, and transparent reporting. Publisher partners include Firefox, Afterpay, and Avast Browser.

The company positions itself as the only search syndication marketplace and allows advertisers to separate bid management by device type (computer/tablet/phone) and traffic source. The company claims that increased pricing control and transparency results in a higher ROI for advertisers.

In 2013, adMarketplace partnered with Kenshoo to offer integration through Kenshoo's campaign management dashboard.

Recognition
In 2014, adMarketplace was named to Deloitte’s Technology Fast 500 as one of the fastest growing technology companies in North America.

The Data Warehousing Institute (TDWI) named adMarketplace a 2014 Best Practices Award winner in Big Data Technology for its Advertiser 3D and BidSmart technologies. Hewlett Packard also recognized adMarketplace with the 2014 Discover Award for its innovation in big data even though their tracking technology is known for its faults.

History
adMarketplace was founded by James Hill in 2000. From 2003 to 2006, it was the exclusive search advertising platform for eBay; when that exclusivity ended, the company opened its platform to all advertisers and publishers. The immediate impact was a major downsize, with just seven employees at one point, but it then grew 50% in 2008 and reached 80 employees in 2011. In 2012, adMarketplace grew to 100 employees, and was named the 8th fastest growing company in New York by Crains. In 2014, adMarketplace was ranked one of the fastest growing technology companies in North America by Deloitte on their annual Fast 500 list, and in 2016 adMarketplace was among the first 100 companies approved for the Trustworthy Accountability Group (TAG) registry

References

Marketing companies established in 2000
Online advertising services and affiliate networks